Sir Theodore Ernest Warren Brinckman, 4th Baronet (21 May 1898 in London, England – 26 July 1954 in London) was an English first-class cricketer. He played often for the Marylebone Cricket Club (MCC), and captained teams that toured the Channel Islands and South America. On tour to South America in 1937–1938, his team played three first-class matches against the Argentina national cricket team, drawing the three match series 1-1.

In 1937, he succeeded his father as baronet. Although Brinckman was married three times, he died without issue and the baronetcy passed to his younger brother Roderick.

References 

1898 births
1954 deaths
English cricketers
Sir T. E. W. Brinckman's XI cricketers
Baronets in the Baronetage of the United Kingdom